Noscopium was a town of ancient Lycia.

Its site is un located.

References

Populated places in ancient Lycia
Former populated places in Turkey
Lost ancient cities and towns